Bathydrilus egenus is a species of clitellate oligochaete worm, first found in Belize, on the Caribbean side of Central America.

References

Further reading
Diaz, Robert J., and Christer Erseus. "Habitat preferences and species associations of shallow-water marine Tubificidae (Oligochaeta) from the barrier reef ecosystems off Belize, Central America." Aquatic Oligochaete Biology V. Springer Netherlands, 1994. 93-105.
Erseus, Christer. "A generic revision of the Phallodrilinae (Oligochaeta, Tubificidae)." Zoologica Scripta 21.1 (1992): 5-48.

External links
WORMS

Tubificina
Taxa named by Christer Erséus